Symphony No. 34 may refer to:

 Symphony No. 34 (Haydn)
 Symphony No. 34 (Michael Haydn)
 Symphony No. 34 (Mozart)

034